The 2001–02 All-Ireland Junior Club Football Championship was the inaugural staging of the All-Ireland Junior Club Football Championship since its establishment by the Gaelic Athletic Association.

The All-Ireland final was played on 18 May 2002 at Shamrock Park in Cremartin, between Drumgoon and Belmullet. Drumgoon won the match by 1-14 to 0-12 to claim their first ever championship title.

All-Ireland Junior Club Football Championship

All-Ireland semi-finals

All-Ireland final

References

2001 in Irish sport
2002 in Irish sport
All-Ireland Junior Club Football Championship
All-Ireland Junior Club Football Championship